Issa Nikiema (born 23 January 1978) is a Burkinabé former football midfielder.

Career
On 29 October 2001 Nikiema moved from RS Settat to Borussia Fulda on a free transfer.

Nikiema joined Gänclärbirliyi Sumqayit at the start of 2004, scoring 11 goals in 12 league games. The following season, Nikiema was the club's top goalscorer with 16, which was the 5th best in the league. Nikiema joined Turan Tovuz for the first half of the 2005–06, before returning to Gänclärbirliyi Sumqayit for the remainder of the season and the next season.

Azerbaijan statistics

Honors
Neftchi Baku
 CIS Cup
 Runners-up: 2005

References

External links
 
 

1978 births
Living people
Sportspeople from Ouagadougou
Association football forwards
Burkinabé footballers
Burkina Faso international footballers
Étoile Filante de Ouagadougou players
ASFA Yennenga players
RS Settat players
Borussia Fulda players
Turan-Tovuz IK players
Olympic Club (Egypt) players
Al-Muharraq SC players
Burkinabé expatriate footballers
Expatriate footballers in Morocco
Expatriate footballers in Germany
Expatriate footballers in Azerbaijan
Expatriate footballers in Egypt
Expatriate footballers in Bahrain
Burkinabé expatriate sportspeople in Morocco
Burkinabé expatriate sportspeople in Germany
Burkinabé expatriate sportspeople in Azerbaijan
Burkinabé expatriate sportspeople in Egypt
Burkinabé expatriate sportspeople in Bahrain
FK Genclerbirliyi Sumqayit players
Neftçi PFK players
21st-century Burkinabé people